Helga Josephine  Zinnbauer, also known as Helga Freund-Zinnbauer, (24 February 1909 – 16 December 1980) was an Australian community worker and librarian.

Zinnbauer was born in Orsova, Austria-Hungary (now Orșova, Romania) to Otto Alscher, a journalist, and his wife Else Leopoldine, née Amon. She worked as a librarian in the Barr Smith Library from 1943 until her retirement in 1974. She died in Adelaide, South Australia. Her funeral was conducted by Johannes Biar, a Lutheran pastor and supporter of the work of the Zinnbauers.

Her husband was Alfred Freund-Zinnbauer, a Lutheran pastor.

See also

References

Australian librarians
Australian women librarians
Austrian Lutherans
Australian Lutherans
1909 births
1980 deaths
20th-century Lutherans